The Olympic Festival can refer to:

Olympic Games, or various events held around them
Australian Youth Olympic Festival, a biannual multi-sport event
European Youth Olympic Festival, a biannual multi-sport event
Olympic Island Festival, a music festival in Toronto
Olympic Music Festival, held in Quilcene, Washington
U.S. Olympic Festival, a former multi-sport event